Events in the year 2016 in the European Union.

Incumbents 
 President of the European Council
 Donald Tusk
 Commission President
 Jean-Claude Juncker 
 Council Presidency 
 (Jan – Jun 2016) 
 (July – Dec 2016) 
 Parliament President
 Martin Schulz
 High Representative
 Federica Mogherini

Events

January 
1 January
Netherlands takes over the six-month rotating presidency of the Council of EU.
San Sebastián (Spain) and Wrocław (Poland) are the European Capitals of Culture for 2016. Both cities will host events to promote their local culture.

May 
On 26 May 2016 the European Commission issued letters of formal notice to 21 member states who had failed to notify the Commission of their transposition of one or more of the three new public procurement directives into their national laws by the due date.
Pact of Amsterdam, 30 May 2016: EU ministers responsible for urban policy agree to allow European cities to have more influence in EU policies across 12 priority policy areas critical to the development of urban areas.

June
 The United Kingdom held a referendum on European Union membership, and voted to leave the EU.

European Capitals of Culture
 San Sebastián, Spain
 Wrocław, Poland

See also
History of the European Union
Timeline of European Union history

References

 
Years of the 21st century in the European Union
2010s in the European Union